Balan Bakama is a commune in the Cercle of Kangaba in the Koulikoro Region of south-western Mali. The principal town lies at Namakama. As of 1998 the commune had a population of 4767.

References

Communes of Koulikoro Region